The  Oakland Raiders season was the franchise's 42nd season in the National Football League and the 52nd overall. 2011 also marked the final season under the ownership of Al Davis, who died on October 8, 2011. The Raiders matched their 8–8 record from 2010, finishing in a three-way tie with the Denver Broncos and San Diego Chargers for the AFC West division title, but lost tiebreakers to both teams, and missed the playoffs for the ninth consecutive season.

On January 4, 2011, it was announced that head coach Tom Cable's contract would not be extended. Cable would be replaced by Hue Jackson, the team's former offensive coordinator. The Raiders traded their first-round selection in the 2011 NFL Draft (17th overall) to the New England Patriots. With their eighth win on December 24 over the Chiefs, the Raiders secured their second consecutive non-losing season. Although TV blackouts had been a persistent issue over the years, all eight regular season home games were sold out for the first time since moving from Los Angeles to Oakland in 1995. The team set the record for being the most penalized team in NFL history, breaking the record previously held by the 1998 Kansas City Chiefs. This season also marked the first consecutive non-losing season for the Raiders since 1998–2002.

Offseason
The Raiders lost guard Robert Gallery and tight end Zach Miller to the Seattle Seahawks and cornerback Nnamdi Asomugha to the Philadelphia Eagles.

Draft

The Raiders did not have a first-round selection. In September 2009, the team acquired DT Richard Seymour from the New England Patriots in exchange for its 2011 first-round selection (#17 overall).

Staff

Final roster

Preseason

Schedule

The Raiders' preseason schedule was announced on April 12, 2011.

Candlestick Park incident

The preseason game against the 49ers was marked by brawls in the stands and a major beating in a restroom at Candlestick Park. The NFL officially discontinued all future preseason games between the two teams.

Regular season

Schedule

Game summaries

Week 1

    
    
    
    
    
    
    
    
    

The Raiders began their 2011 campaign at Sports Authority Field at Mile High, for a Week 1 AFC West duel with the Denver Broncos in the second game of Monday Night Football's doubleheader.  Oakland trailed early in the first quarter as Broncos kicker Matt Prater got a 28-yard field goal.  The Raiders answered in the second quarter as quarterback Jason Campbell found fullback Marcel Reece on a 3-yard touchdown pass, followed by a 37-yard, a 21-yard, and an NFL record tying 63-yard field goal from kicker Sebastian Janikowski. Janikowski's leg helped put the Raiders up 16–3 at halftime.

Denver answered in the third quarter as wide receiver Eric Decker returned a punt 90 yards for a touchdown, followed by Prater getting a 30-yard field goal. Oakland struck back in the fourth quarter with Campbell's 1-yard touchdown.  The Broncos tried to rally with quarterback Kyle Orton completing a 9-yard touchdown pass to running back Lance Ball, yet the Raiders' offense was able to run out the clock.

With the win, not only did Oakland begin their season at 1–0, but they also snapped their 8-straight opening day losing streak.

Week 2

Week 3

Week 4

Week 5

    
    
    
    
    
    
    
    
    
    

A day after owner Al Davis died, the Raiders fought back from an early deficit and defensive back Michael Huff made a pick in the end zone in the waning seconds for an emotional victory.  On that final play, the Raiders only had ten men on the field on defense, and Huff emotionally stated that he believed the team's late owner, Al Davis, "had his hand on that ball."

Week 6

Week 7

With the loss, the Raiders went into their bye week at 4–3.  Also, the Raiders were shut out at home for the first time since Week 1 of the 2006 season when the team was shut out by the Chargers.

Week 9

Week 10

    
    
    
    
    
    
    

Trying to snap a two-game losing streak, the Raiders flew to Qualcomm Stadium for a Week 10 AFC West duel with the San Diego Chargers on Thursday night.  Oakland trailed early in the first quarter as Chargers kicker Nick Novak got a 20-yard field goal, yet the Raiders answered with a 2-yard touchdown run from running back Michael Bush.  Oakland added onto their lead in the second quarter with a 23-yard field goal from kicker Sebastian Janikowski, followed by quarterback Carson Palmer finding rookie wide receiver Denarius Moore on a 33-yard touchdown pass.

San Diego began the third quarter with quarterback Philip Rivers completing a 30-yard touchdown pass to wide receiver Vincent Brown, yet the Raiders struck back with Palmer hooking up with Moore again on a 26-yard touchdown pass.  Afterwards, the Chargers closed out the quarter with Rivers completing a 7-yard touchdown pass to fullback Jacob Hester.  From there, Oakland's defense held on to preserve the victory.

With the win, the Raiders improved to 5–4, and took the lead of the AFC West.

Week 11

Week 12

Sebastian Janikowski kicked a team-record six field goals and the Raiders took advantage of three interceptions from Chicago's Caleb Hanie to beat the Bears 25–20 Sunday.

Carson Palmer threw for 301 yards and Michael Bush iced the game with a touchdown run in the fourth quarter to lead the Raiders (7–4) to their third straight win against a Bears team missing starting quarterback Jay Cutler.

Week 13

Week 14

Week 15

Week 16

Week 17

With the loss, the Raiders' season ended at 8–8 and their three-game winning streak over the Chargers was snapped. The loss also allowed the Broncos to win the AFC West.

Standings

Death of owner Al Davis
On October 8, one day before the team's Week 5 game at the Houston Texans, owner Al Davis died in his Oakland, California home at the age of 82. The Raiders won the game 25–20.

Acquisition of Carson Palmer
On October 18, 2011, the Raiders acquired quarterback Carson Palmer from the Cincinnati Bengals for a 2012 first round draft pick and a conditional 2013 first round pick based on incentives. 
The trade was made two days after Jason Campbell suffered a potential season ending collarbone injury in Week 6 against the Cleveland Browns.

Firing of Hue Jackson
On January 10, 2012, the Raiders announced that head coach Hue Jackson would be fired.

Notes and references

Oakland Raiders seasons
R00
Oakland
2011 in sports in California